Nicole Arendt and Ai Sugiyama won in the final 6–4, 7–6 (7–2) against Nannie de Villiers and Annabel Ellwood.

Seeds
Champion seeds are indicated in bold text while text in italics indicates the round in which those seeds were eliminated.

 Nicole Arendt /  Ai Sugiyama (champions)
 Chanda Rubin /  Sandrine Testud (first round)
 Liezel Horn /  Paola Suárez (first round)
 Kristie Boogert /  Miriam Oremans (quarterfinals)

Draw

Qualifying

Seeds
Both seeded teams received byes to the second round.

  Zsófia Gubacsi /  Tatiana Perebiynis (second round)
  Evelyn Fauth /  Petra Mandula (second round)

Qualifiers
  Dája Bedáňová /  Haruka Inoue

Draw
 NB: The first two rounds used the pro set format.

References
 2001 Canberra International Doubles Draw

Doubles